This is a list of earthquakes in Texas.

1931 Valentine earthquake
1995 Marathon earthquake
Oklahoma earthquake swarms (2009–present) – North Texas affected by earthquakes through February 2016

Texas
Earthquakes